Mount Ḥaṣṣ or Mount Aḥaṣṣ (northern Syrian vernacular: ǧabal əl-Ḥəṣṣ) is a 500-metre-high plateau (maximum height 638 m) on the northern fringe of the Syrian Desert. It is located in the Safīrah District of Aleppo Governorate in Syria.

Location and description
The plateau extends for 60 km with a width of about 30 km on the western side of Lake Jabboul from Safīrah in the north to Sabkhat Kharāyij and Sabkhat Ḥammām in the south. To the east lie the Qinnasrīn plain (southern Aleppo plain) and the Maṭkh lowland. A lesser elevation called Mount Shabīth (highest point 360 m) is found in the southeast, beyond which lie Sabkhat Shabīth. The plain of Khunāṣir separates between Mount Ḥaṣṣ and Mount Shabīth.

The area has more than 150 villages inhabited by Bedouins or people of Bedouinic ancestry. It is one of the poorest regions in Syria. A development project aims to improve living standards.

An ancient fortress dating to classical antiquity has been recently uncovered on Mount Ḥaṣṣ.

References

Aleppo
Aleppo Governorate
Mountains of Syria